Frank Makua (born 17 January 1974) is a South African former footballer who played at both professional and international levels as a midfielder. Makua last played club football for Witbank Spurs; he also earned four caps for the South African national side between 2001 and 2003.

References

1974 births
Living people
South African soccer players
South Africa international soccer players
Kaizer Chiefs F.C. players
Association football midfielders
Dynamos F.C. (South Africa) players